Oghlan Tappeh Rural District is in Ramjin District of Chaharbagh County, Alborz province, Iran. At the census of 2016, its constituent parts were in Chaharbagh District of Savojbolagh County, before Chaharbagh County was established in 2019. The center of the rural district is the village of Oghlan Tappeh, whose population in 2016 was 2,085.

References 

Rural Districts of Alborz Province

Populated places in Alborz Province

fa:دهستان اغلان‌تپه